Atrypanius haldemani is a species of beetle in the family Cerambycidae. It was described by John Lawrence LeConte in 1852.

References

Beetles described in 1852